Gerardi is an Italian surname. It may refer to:
 Federico Gerardi (born 1987), Italian footballer
 Giulio Gerardi (1912–2001), Italian cross-country skier
 Juan José Gerardi Conedera (1922–1998), Roman Catholic Bishop in Guatemala
 Kellie Gerardi
 Roberto Gerardi
 Sheyene Gerardi, Venezuelan actress, producer, and media executive

Italian-language surnames
Patronymic surnames
Surnames from given names